Arakandanallur is a panchayat town in Viluppuram district  in the state of Tamil Nadu, India. The place is known for the historic Atulya Nadheswarar Temple built in rock-cut architecture on a small hillock.

Demographics

 India census, Arakandanallur had a population of 4450. Males constitute 50% of the population and females 50%. Arakandanallur has an average literacy rate of 75%, higher than the national average of 59.5%; with 58% of the males and 42% of females literate. 10% of the population is under 6 years of age.

Schools and colleges
Though in this town Panchayat, Many Colleges and schools were present. Some of the places are:

 Government Polytechnic College
 Valliammai college of arts and Science for Women
 Government Higher Secondary School
 Sri Lakshmi Vidhyalaya Higher Secondary School
 Balamandir Matriculation Higher Secondary school

References

Cities and towns in Viluppuram district